Ioditis mokwae is a moth of the family Tortricidae. It is found in Nigeria.

The wingspan is about 18 mm. The ground colour of the forewings is greyish with white suffusions and brownish dots. The costal strigulae (fine streaks) are whitish and divisions grey brown. The markings have the form of a grey-brown subapical blotch. The hindwings are grey, slightly mixed with brownish on the peripheries.

Etymology
The species name refers to Mokwa, the type locality.

References

Moths described in 2013
Grapholitini